LMS diesel shunter 7057, later to become NCC Class 22, was built by Harland & Wolff. Testing started in July 1934 and the locomotive was taken into LMS stock in February 1935.  It was loaned to the War Department between 1941-1943, which numbered it 233. It was withdrawn from LMS stock in January 1944 and sold back to Harland & Wolff, which rebuilt it with a new 225 hp (168 kW) engine and converted it to the  gauge. It was then sold to the Northern Counties Committee, which numbered it 22. It was finally withdrawn in April 1965 and scrapped at the close of that year.

See also
 LMS diesel shunters
 Diesel locomotives of Ireland

References

7057
Diesel shunter 7057
War Department locomotives
Northern Counties Committee locomotives
C locomotives
Railway locomotives introduced in 1934
Diesel locomotives of Northern Ireland
5 ft 3 in gauge locomotives
Scrapped locomotives